Cabano is a former city in Témiscouata Regional County Municipality within the Bas-Saint-Laurent region of Quebec, Canada. It is situated on Lake Témiscouata on Autoroute 85. On May 5, 2010 it merged with Notre-Dame-du-Lac to form the new city of Témiscouata-sur-le-Lac.

History 
At first, Cabano was called Poste du Lac or Fort Ingall. It became Saint-Mathias-de-Cabano in 1907, then the municipal village of Cabano in 1923, and finally, the city of Cabano in 1962.

On May 9, 1950, a major fire destroyed 125 houses in the city.

TFI International, Canada's largest trucking company, was founded in Cabano.

Notable people
 Paul Triquet - Recipient of the Victoria Cross for actions in Italy during the Second World War
 Ingrid St-Pierre - Singer-songwriter

References

External links

City web site (archived)

Former municipalities in Quebec
Populated places established in 1880
Populated places disestablished in 2010
Former cities in Quebec
1880 establishments in Quebec